Héctor Oscar Rivoira (10 April 1960 – 14 August 2019) was an Argentine football manager and player who worked as the manager of Atlético Tucumán.

Playing career
Rivoira played for the River Plate youth teams but never played for the first team. in 1981 he joined Almirante Brown where he played 155 games. He then joined Deportivo Italia where he had a brief stint as a Primera División player during the 1986-87 season. Later in his career he played for Club Atlético Lanús and Defensores de Belgrano before playing out his career with local side Club Atlético Ituzaingó.

Managerial career
Rivoira was given the job as manager of Club Atlético Ituzaingó in 1992. He also managed a number of other teams in the 2nd division (Primera B Nacional) teams in the 1990s. In 1999 his Chacarita Juniors team was promoted to the Primera Division after a 2nd place finish. He managed the team for the full Apertura 1999 tournament but was sacked four games into Clausura 2000.

After a season with Quilmes  Rivoira travelled to Ecuador to become manager of LDU Quito.

In 2003, he returned to Argentina and became manager of Instituto de Córdoba and led them to the Primera B Nacional championship and earned a team promotion to the Primera División for the 2nd time. Following this promotion he was sacked only 9 games into the Primera División season.

He returned to the 2nd tier managing Ferro Carril Oeste and Chacarita Juniors before returning to instituto in 2007.

In 2008, he took over as manager of newly promoted Atlético Tucumán and led them to the 2008-09 Primera B Nacional championship, his 2nd championship and third promotion at this level. After a poor start to the Primera División season he resigned after 12 games of the Apertura. In December 2009 he was unveiled as the new manager of Club Atlético Huracán, his first appointment as manager of an established Primera División club.

On August 14, 2019, he died at age 59 after struggling for a year with colon cancer.

Titles as a manager

References

External links

Argentine Primera statistics at Futbol XXI 

1960 births
2019 deaths
Sportspeople from Buenos Aires Province
Argentine footballers
Association football midfielders
Club Atlético Lanús footballers
Argentine football managers
Nueva Chicago managers
Chacarita Juniors managers
Quilmes Atlético Club managers
Instituto managers
Ferro Carril Oeste managers
Atlético Tucumán managers
Club Atlético Huracán managers
L.D.U. Quito managers
Deportivo Italia managers
Rosario Central managers
Deaths from cancer in Argentina
Deaths from colorectal cancer
Crucero del Norte managers